The surname Hueck or von Hueck may refer to:

 Alfredo Hueck (born 1980), Venezuelan film producer and director
 Alexander Friedrich von Hueck (1802–1842), Baltic-German professor of anatomy
 Else Hueck-Dehio (1897–1976), German author
 Karl Johann von Hueck (1844–1925), Estonian politician

See also  
Huck (surname)
Huyck